Jack Campbell (born January 9, 1992) is an American professional ice hockey goaltender for the Edmonton Oilers of the National Hockey League (NHL). Prior to his professional career, Campbell played for the Windsor Spitfires and Sault Ste. Marie Greyhounds of the Ontario Hockey League. He was selected in the first round (11th overall) by the Dallas Stars in the 2010 NHL Entry Draft and made his NHL debut in 2013. After spending several years in the minors, Campbell was traded to the Los Angeles Kings, serving as the team's backup before joining the Toronto Maple Leafs in 2020, where he emerged as an effective starting netminder and was named an NHL All-Star in 2022. He left Toronto after the 2021–22 season to sign with the Oilers.

Internationally, Campbell has represented the United States at both a junior and senior level. During the 2010 World Junior Ice Hockey Championships, Campbell backstopped the Americans to a victory over the Canadians in the gold medal game.

Early life
Campbell was born on January 9, 1992, in Port Huron, Michigan, to parents Jack Sr. and Debbie. Campbell was inspired by his older cousin Marshall to become a goaltender. Although his father, uncle, and coaches tried to convince Campbell to play other positions, he continued as a goaltender.

Playing career

Amateur
As a youth, Campbell played in the 2005 Quebec International Pee-Wee Hockey Tournament with the Detroit Little Caesars minor ice hockey team. Little Caesars lost the first game of the tournament 2-0 to Burnaby, placing them in the losers' bracket. From there, they would go on to win the tournament, defeating Detroit Compuware in the finals.

He eventually graduated to the Detroit Honeybaked midget team. From there, Campbell was drafted 108th overall in the 2008 Ontario Hockey League Priority Selection. Despite his selection, Campbell joined the USA Hockey National Team Development Program (NTDP) in 2008. In his second season within the North American Hockey League (NAHL), Campbell received the Dave Peterson Goalie of the Year Award.

On November 24, 2009, Campbell withdrew his verbal intent to play Division 1 hockey for the University of Michigan Wolverines in order to qualify to play in the OHL. By the conclusion of his two seasons with the NTDP, Campbell had set a new franchise record for lowest goals-against average and most shutouts in a career. He also earned a gold medal for Team USA at the 2009 IIHF World U18 Championships and 2010 IIHF World U18 Championships. As a result, Campbell was drafted 11th overall by the Dallas Stars in the 2010 NHL Entry Draft. Campbell was also chosen in the seventh round (170th overall) by Dinamo Minsk in the 2010 Kontinental Hockey League Junior Draft.

OHL
On July 28, 2010, Campbell left the NTDP and joined the Windsor Spitfires who had drafted him in 2008.  He struggled in his first season, putting up poor numbers and was eventually traded to the Sault Ste. Marie Greyhounds for MacKenzie Braid, Patrick Sieloff, a 2012 third-round pick, a 2013 second- and third-round pick, two second-round picks in 2014, a second-round pick in 2015 and a conditional 15th-round pick in 2016.

Professional

Dallas Stars
Following the conclusion of the 2011–12 season with the Greyhounds, the Stars assigned Campbell to their American Hockey League (AHL) affiliate, the Texas Stars. On March 23, he made his professional debut against the Oklahoma City Barons in a loss. Two nights later, on March 25, he won his first professional game against the Toronto Marlies. He made 32 saves on the way to a 4–2 win. On March 30, he had his first professional shutout over the Lake Erie Monsters by making 30 saves in the 4–0 win.

After attending the Stars' training camp, Campbell was assigned to the American Hockey League to begin the 2013–14 season. On October 20, 2013, Campbell was recalled from Texas and made his NHL debut with Dallas, posting a 6–3 loss against the Anaheim Ducks. He was returned to the American Hockey League where he helped lead the Stars to the 2014 Calder Cup.

Despite his championship season, Campbell was assigned to the American Hockey League to begin the 2014–15 season after attending the Stars' training camp. Prior to the 2015–16 season, Campbell injured his hand which delayed his season debut. Upon his return to the lineup, Campbell went 1–3–0 in each of his starts. However, on December 28, 2015, Campbell was reassigned to the Texas Stars' East Coast Hockey League (ECHL) affiliate, Idaho Steelheads for an undetermined amount of time. Campbell describes this time as difficult for his mental health and he felt unmotivated to play hockey. He said he would "view myself in the mirror as like if I'm a good or bad person based on if I won or lost." However, upon his return to the American Hockey League, Campbell recorded 11 wins out of 14 starts.

Los Angeles Kings

Unable to progress within the Stars organization, on June 25, 2016, Campbell was traded to the Los Angeles Kings for defenseman Nick Ebert. On July 11, 2016, Campbell signed as a restricted free agent to a two-year, two-way contract with the Kings. On November 22, 2017, he signed a two-year contract extension with the Kings. On February 27, 2018, Campbell made 41 saves and earned his first NHL win in a 4–1 victory over the Vegas Golden Knights. On October 11, 2018, Campbell recorded his first NHL shutout with 40 saves against the Montreal Canadiens. He developed a friendship with fellow goaltender Jonathan Quick and accompanied him to the 2018 NHL Awards as his "backup", carrying a towel and water bottle with him.

His success was short lived, however, as he suffered a knee injury on November 10. At the time of his injury, Campbell had played in 13 games with a 5–7–0 record. On December 19, the Kings assigned Campbell to the Ontario Reign on a conditioning assignment. He was recalled from the Reign on December 31, 2018, and started the Kings following game on January 1, 2019, against the Vegas Golden Knights.

On September 7, 2019, the Kings re-signed Campbell to a two-year, $3.3 million contract extension.

Toronto Maple Leafs
On February 5, 2020, the Kings traded Campbell (alongside Kyle Clifford) to the Toronto Maple Leafs for Trevor Moore, a third-round pick in 2020, and a conditional third-round pick in 2021. He made his Maple Leafs debut on February 7, resulting in a 5–4 overtime win against the Anaheim Ducks.

Initially acquired to strengthen team goaltending depth and serve as a backup to starting netminder Frederik Andersen, Campbell quickly emerged as a skilled goalie in Toronto and became the team's starter the following season, overtaking Andersen's role through strong play. Since arriving in Toronto, Campbell has experienced much success and become a fan favourite, setting several records and joining the league leaders in goaltending statistics. On April 7, 2021, Campbell set a Maple Leafs record for consecutive wins by a goaltender, with 10. The previous franchise record of 9 was shared by Felix Potvin, Jacques Plante and John Ross Roach. He additionally tied the league record with Montreal Canadiens goalie Carey Price for consecutive wins to start a season, and later setting a new and final record of 11 in the following game on April 10, 2021, when the Leafs beat the Ottawa Senators 6–5. Campbell would remain the team's starter for the rest of the season, helping them qualify for the playoffs, where he would make his post-season debut. Despite strong play from the netminder, the team would lose in the opening round.

Campbell continued his strong play the following season, remaining the team's starter and elevating himself to be among the leaders in several goaltending categories. On November 2, 2021, he achieved the fifth shutout of his career against the Golden Knights. Campbell's success in Toronto was rewarded when, on January 13, 2022, he was selected for the 2022 NHL All-Star Game, his first NHL all star game, along with teammate Auston Matthews. At the time of his selection to the game, Campbell had a record of 18–5–3 with a .935 save percentage (second in the league for goaltenders) and a 2.02 goals-against average. Following the All-Star break, Campbell's play pronouncedly declined, coinciding with ongoing struggles of his tandem partner Petr Mrazek that put the Maple Leafs' goaltending into question. A February 26 game against the Detroit Red Wings was widely identified as the nadir, with Campbell giving up four goals in six minutes in the third period and being pulled, while Mrazek and both Red Wings goalies also struggled, leading to a 10–7 Leafs victory. In March, it was announced that Campbell was dealing with a rib injury and would miss several weeks. In his absence, Mrazek was also injured, greatly expanding the role of Marlies goaltender Erik Källgren. Campbell returned to the crease for the remainder of the season, and saw his play improve. He finished the regular season with a 31–9–6	record and a .914 save percentage. The Leafs entered the 2022 Stanley Cup playoffs for a round one matchup with the Tampa Bay Lightning. Campbell was considered a key factor opposite Vezina- and Conn Smythe Trophy-winning Lightning goaltender Andrei Vasilevskiy. In a closely fought series, the Leafs were eventually eliminated in seven games.

With the conclusion of Campbell's contract, he was seen as one of the strongest free agent goaltenders available, and it was perceived as unlikely that the Maple Leafs would re-sign him at his desired price and term. Days prior to the opening of free agency it was announced that the Leafs had traded for Ottawa Senators goaltender Matt Murray, which was widely taken as confirmation that Campbell would not be returning.

Edmonton Oilers
On July 13, 2022, Campbell signed as a free agent to a five-year, $25 million contract with the Edmonton Oilers.

International play
Campbell represented the United States numerous times over the course of his career, but his most memorable youth international competition was the 2010 World Junior Ice Hockey Championships where he backstopped the Americans to an upset victory over the host Canadians in the gold medal game. For his efforts, he was named Goaltender of the Tournament. Following this tournament, he was again invited to the USA Hockey National Junior Evaluation Camp prior to the 2012 IIHF World Junior Championship.

Campbell finally made his international senior debut during the 2015 Men's Ice Hockey World Championships where Team USA won bronze.

Personal life 
On June 24, 2022, Campbell got engaged to his girlfriend Ashley Sonnenberg.

Career statistics

Regular season and playoffs

International

International

Awards and honours

References

External links
 

1992 births
Living people
American expatriate ice hockey players in Canada
American men's ice hockey goaltenders
Dallas Stars draft picks
Dallas Stars players
HC Dinamo Minsk draft picks
Edmonton Oilers players
Idaho Steelheads (ECHL) players
Ice hockey players from Michigan
Los Angeles Kings players
National Hockey League first-round draft picks
Ontario Reign (AHL) players
People from Port Huron, Michigan
Sault Ste. Marie Greyhounds players
Sportspeople from Metro Detroit
Texas Stars players
Toronto Maple Leafs players
USA Hockey National Team Development Program players
Windsor Spitfires players